Materazzi is an Italian surname. Notable people with the surname include:

Marco Materazzi, Italian football player
Giuseppe Materazzi, Italian football player and manager, Marco's father
Riccardo Materazzi, Italian middle-distance runner
Daniel Materazzi (born 1985), Portuguese footballer who is nicknamed after Marco

Italian-language surnames